Avengers, sometimes known as Avenger and known in Japan as , is a 1986 overhead-view vertical scrolling beat 'em up arcade game developed and published by Capcom. The game was directed by Takashi Nishiyama, who previously designed the side-scrolling beat 'em ups Kung-Fu Master (1984) and Trojan (1986), and later designed the original Street Fighter (1987) and several early SNK fighting games.

Gameplay

The game takes place in Paradise City, where the villain, "Geshita", has captured 6 girls from the city. The player's objective (as Ryu or Ko) is to banish "Geshita" from Paradise City once and for all. During the game, the player can pick up powerups like the "Speed Up", the Super Punch, Grenades, Shurikens, Nunchaku and extra health. The game also features hidden areas on each level, accessed by breaking doors in structures on either side of the screen. The player's character has 3 normal means of attack: Punches, which are quick with short range, Kicks, which are slower with longer range, and the Roundhouse, which hits in a 360 degree motion.

Ports and related releases
Avengers was later included in Capcom Classics Collection: Remixed for the PSP and Capcom Classics Collection Vol. 2 for the PlayStation 2 and Xbox. It was one of the initial games available for download in Capcom Arcade Cabinet, a compilation digitally released for PlayStation 3 and Xbox 360 on February 19, 2013.

See also
 List of beat 'em ups

References

External links

Avengers at Arcade History

1986 video games
1987 video games
Arcade video games
Capcom beat 'em ups
Capcom games
PlayStation 3 games
PlayStation Network games
Video games developed in Japan
Video games scored by Tamayo Kawamoto
Xbox 360 Live Arcade games
Vertically-oriented video games